Ryan Casciaro (born 11 May 1984) is a retired Gibraltarian football defender who played for Gibraltar Premier Division side Manchester 62 and the Gibraltar national team. After spending the majority of his senior career at Lincoln Red Imps, he joined St Joseph's on 5 August 2018, he joined Manchester 62 on 4 February 2021.

International career
Casciaro made his international debut with Gibraltar on 19 November 2013 in a 0-0 home draw with Slovakia. This was Gibraltar's first game since being admitted to UEFA.

International career statistics

Personal life
Casciaro is a policeman for the Gibraltar Defence Police. His brothers Kyle and Lee have also played with Gibraltar's national side.

Notes

References

External links

 
 
 

1984 births
Living people
Gibraltarian footballers
Gibraltar international footballers
Association football defenders
Gibraltar United F.C. players
Lincoln Red Imps F.C. players
St Joseph's F.C. players
Gibraltar Premier Division players